Jimmy Dale may refer to:

 Jimmy Dale (footballer) (1870–1948), Scottish footballer
 Jimmy Dale (musician) (1935–2017), Canadian musician